"I Wish I Was Still in Your Dreams" is a song written by John Barlow Jarvis and Don Cook, and recorded by American country music artist Conway Twitty.  It was released in November 1988 as the third single from the album Still in Your Dreams.  The song reached #4 on the Billboard Hot Country Singles & Tracks chart.

Chart performance

Year-end charts

References

1989 singles
Conway Twitty songs
Songs written by Don Cook
Song recordings produced by Jimmy Bowen
MCA Records singles
Songs written by John Barlow Jarvis
1988 songs